Lisanally Rangers was an intermediate-level football club, based in Armagh and playing in the Mid-Ulster Football League in Northern Ireland. Club colours were white and black. The club withdrew from all competitions in July 2014.

References

External links
 Daily Mirror Mid-Ulster Football League Official website
 nifootball.co.uk - (For fixtures, results and tables of all Northern Ireland amateur football leagues)

Defunct association football clubs in Northern Ireland
Association football clubs established in 1978
Association football clubs disestablished in 2014
Association football clubs in County Armagh
1978 establishments in Northern Ireland
2014 disestablishments in Northern Ireland